Alfred Adrian Jones  (9 February 1845 – 24 January 1938) was an English sculptor and painter who specialized in depicting animals, particularly horses. Before becoming a full-time artist he was an army veterinary surgeon for twenty-three years. On retirement from the Army, Jones established himself as an artist with a studio in London. He became a regular exhibitor at the Royal Academy and in commercial galleries from 1884 onwards. His training as a veterinary surgeon gave him a deep knowledge of equine anatomy which he used in his work to great effect. He created the sculpture Peace descending on the Quadriga of War, on top of the Wellington Arch at Hyde Park Corner in London. Following both the Boer War and World War I, Jones created a number of notable war memorials including the Royal Marines Memorial and the Cavalry of the Empire Memorial, both in central London. Alongside the public monuments he created, Jones made equestrian and equine statuettes and portrait busts. Whilst well known as a sculptor, Jones was also an accomplished painter.

Biography

Early life and military career
Jones was born in Ludlow, Shropshire, the fourth son of James Brookholding Jones and his wife Jane Marshall, and was educated at Ludlow Grammar School. Despite his wish for a career as an artist, Jones was persuaded by his father to train as a vet. He studied at the Royal Veterinary College, qualifying as a veterinary surgeon in 1866. He enrolled in the Army as a veterinary officer in the Royal Horse Artillery the following year and served from 1867 to 1890. During this time he saw service in the Abyssinian Expedition of 1868 before joining the 3rd Hussars in 1869. From 1871 to 1881 he served with the Queen's Bays in Ireland and was then attached to the 7th Queen's Own Hussars and fought with them in the First Anglo-Boer War in 1881. In South Africa he was attached to the Inniskilling Dragoons. In 1884 Jones served in Egypt where he selected camels for the Nile Expedition and finally joined the 2nd Life Guards, retiring in 1890 with the rank of captain.  He was awarded a medal for his service in Abyssinia and the Khedive's Star for his work on the Nile Expedition. Jones was made a member of the Royal Victorian Order in 1907.

Artistic career
Jones was already active as an artist by the time he retired from the Army, having painted and sketched throughout his military career. In 1892 he had received some teaching in sculpture techniques from Charles Bell Birch and had shown a plaster statuette, One of the Right Sort, at the Royal Academy in 1884. In 1887 Jones' bronze Gone Away won first prize in the Goldsmith's Company's statuette contest. His terracotta Camel Corps Scout and The Last Arrow in bronze were both well received when exhibited in 1886 and 1888 respectively. Jones became a regular exhibitor at the Royal Academy, at the Royal Glasgow Institute of the Fine Arts and in commercial galleries plus at the Paris Salon and the Royal Institute.

In 1891 Jones exhibited a plaster work, Triumph featuring a quadriga of four horses and a chariot. The model greatly impressed the Prince of Wales who began campaigning for a monumental version to be created for the Wellington Arch in central London. Opposition to this proposal was led by Sir Frederick Leighton, the president of the Royal Academy, who considered the commission beyond the ability of a largely self-taught artist such as Jones. To demonstrate his skill with large scale works, Jones created Duncan's Horses, a plaster equine group shown at the Royal Academy in 1892. Despite insinuations that Duncan's Horses was not by him, Jones won the Wellington Arch commission and worked on Peace descending on the Quadriga of War from 1907 until 1912. Until his death in 1910, Edward VII frequently visited Jones' studio to view progress on what became largest bronze sculpture in Britain. The casting was completed by November 1911 and the complex matter of hoisting the Quadriga into position took place in January 1912. In April 1912 King George and Queen Mary drove through the arch and were presented to Jones. The addition of a tablet noting that the Quadriga was a gift of Lord Michelham was affixed to the monument in 1916. The young boy in Jones' composition for the Quadriga was based on Lord Michelham's son.

Jones was also an accomplished painter. His notable paintings included a portrait of Lord Kitchener and an equestrian portrait of Sir David Campbell on his Grand National winning horse.

Later life
Nominated by Goscombe John, Jones became a member of the Royal Society of British Sculptors in 1912 and was elected a Fellow of the same society in 1923. Jones' autobiography, Memoirs of a Soldier Artist was published in 1933. In 1934 Jones became an Honorary Associate of the Royal College of Veterinary Surgeons, and he was also an honorary member of the Incorporated Association of Architects and Surveyors. In 1935 he received the gold medal of the Royal Society of British Sculptors.

Jones was married twice. In 1870 he married Emma Buckingham from Ross-on-Wye who died in 1887 and in 1891 he married Emma Wedlake and established a home and studio with her in Chelsea. That property was next door to the Chelsea Arts Club and Jones became an active member and sometimes office holder of the club. He died of influenza and bronchitis at his home in 147 Church Street, Chelsea, in January 1938 aged 92 and was cremated at Golders Green Crematorium. A memorial plaque to Jones is to be found at St. Laurence's Church in Ludlow, where his ashes are buried, next to that of the poet A. E. Housman.

Selected public works

1895-1919

1920-1929

Other works
 For the Faith, a 1903 equestrian statuette, current whereabouts unknown, shown at the Royal Academy in 1903.
 A silver statuette of Colonel Asfur Dowla, the A.D.C. to the Nizam of Hyderabad, shown at the Royal Academy in 1903, but current whereabouts unknown.
 In 1985, Jones' 1892 plaster group Duncan's Horses was cast in bronze and erected in the grounds of the Royal Veterinary College, Hawkshead Campus in Hertfordshire.

Gallery of images

Further reading
"Memoirs of a Soldier Artist" by Adrian Jones, published by Stanley Paul & Co. London. 1933
"Triumph: The Life and Art of Captain Adrian Jones" by Robert S. Burns, published by Logaston Press www.logastonpress.co.uk .
"Adrian Jones: Cavalry Officer, Veterinary Surgeon and distinguished Sculptor/Artist", article published by Veterinary History (pages 68–72)~ Journal of the Veterinary History Society, Vol 15 No.1, 2009. ISSN 0301-6943.

References

External links

1845 births
1938 deaths
19th-century English painters
19th-century English sculptors
19th-century English male artists
20th-century English painters
20th-century English sculptors
20th-century English male artists
Artists from Shropshire
British military personnel of the Abyssinian War
English male painters
English male sculptors
People from Ludlow